Ceropterella is a genus of flies belonging to the family Lesser Dung flies.

Species
A. nitidosa (Richards, 1953)

References

Sphaeroceridae
Diptera of Africa
Brachycera genera